The 1903 Calgary municipal election took place on December 14, 1903 to elect a Mayor and nine Aldermen to sit on the twentieth Calgary City Council from January 5, 1904 to January 2, 1905.

Background
The election was held under multiple non-transferable vote where each elector was able to cast a ballot for the mayor and up to three ballots for separate councillors with a voter's designated ward.

1904 Calgary Land Sales
In March 1903, the City of Calgary Council hastily authorized the sale of 500 lots and sold quickly with little advertisement. Many of the high quality properties were purchased by a handful of businessmen, some represented by Alderman J. A. McKenzie. Residents demanded an investigation and on March 26, 1904 Council passed a resolution for Chief Justice Sifton to hold an investigation. Sifton found council had acted with "gross carelessness". Aldermen McKenzie and Macdonald in Ward 1 were found to have invalidated their office by entering into contracts with the city for land, while Aldermen Irwin and Hornby were able to retain their office as they never actually paid for their lots. A by-election was held on April 23, 1904 to replace the two disqualified aldermen.

Results

Mayor
Silas Alexander Ramsay - Acclaimed

Councillors

Ward 1

Ward 2
William Henry Cushing - Acclaimed
John Irwin - Acclaimed
John Hamilton Kerr - Acclaimed

Ward 3

See also
List of Calgary municipal elections

References

Sources
Frederick Hunter: THE MAYORS AND COUNCILS  OF  THE CORPORATION OF CALGARY Archived March 3, 2020

Politics of Calgary
Municipal elections in Calgary
1903 elections in Canada
1900s in Calgary